Maya Stewart (born 14 March 2000) is an Australian rugby union player. She plays for the NSW Waratahs in the Super W competition.

Biography 
Stewart played several sports as a teen, including league and touch. She began her rugby career with the Nelson Bay Gropers, before moving to the Hunter Wildfires and then eventually making her way to the Waratahs in the Super W competition.

In 2021, Stewart scored four tries against the Queensland Reds in the opening game of the Super W season. Her year was shortened after she sustained an ACL injury for the second time.

Stewart suffered another ACL injury in a pre-season training ahead of the 2022 Super W campaign and was ruled out for the season. After her recovery, she was named in the Wallaroos squad to face the Black Ferns for the 2022 Laurie O'Reilly Cup, although she did not get to play in any matches.

Despite her setbacks, Stewart was impressive during the Wallaroos camp and made the squad for the Rugby World Cup in New Zealand.

References

External links 

 Wallaroos Profile

2000 births
Living people
Australia women's international rugby union players
Australian female rugby union players